Tumatai Dauphin (born 12 January 1988) is a French Polynesian shot-putter who has represented French Polynesia at the Pacific Games and Pacific Mini Games, and France at the Jeux de la Francophonie.

Dauphin has been competing with the shot put since the age of 15. He moved to France in 2006 to pursue his athletics career. After a serious ankle injury ended his Olympic aspirations, he returned to French Polynesia to recover and become a coach. 

He won gold in shot put at the 2009 Jeux de la Francophonie in Beirut. At the 2011 Pacific Games in Nouméa he won gold in the shot put. He won gold at the 2015 French Indoor Athletics Championships with a record throw of 20.10 meters. At the 2015 Pacific Games in Port Moresby he won gold, and set a Pacific games record of 19.14 meters. At the 2019 Pacific Games in Apia he won silver. At the 2022 Pacific Mini Games in Saipan he won gold.

He currently coaches Loveleina Wong-Sang.

References

Living people
1988 births
French Polynesian shot putters